Tylin  is a settlement in the administrative district of Gmina Mykanów, within Częstochowa County, Silesian Voivodeship, in southern Poland.

The settlement has a population of 112.

References

Tylin